Diebel is a surname. Notable people with the surname include:

 John Diebel (born 1943), American businessman
 Nelson Diebel (born 1970), American swimmer
 Linda Diebel (born 1949, died 2020), Canadian journalist

See also
 15276 Diebel, a main-belt asteroid
 Diegel